Noctitrella is a genus of crickets in the tribe Podoscirtini.  Species have been recorded in: southern China and Indochina.

Species 
The Orthoptera Species File includes the following species:
 Noctitrella ardua Gorochov, 2003
 Noctitrella berezini Gorochov, 2003
 Noctitrella denticulata Liu & Shi, 2013
 Noctitrella devexa Gorochov, 2003
 Noctitrella hirsuta Ingrisch, 1997
 Noctitrella parardua Gorochov, 2003
 Noctitrella plurilingua Ingrisch, 1997
 Noctitrella spinosa Gorochov, 2003
 Noctitrella tranquilla Gorochov, 1990 - type species

References

External links
 

Ensifera genera
crickets
Orthoptera of Indo-China